Thomas Wilkins (born c.1956) is an orchestra conductor.

Early life and education
Wilkins was born in Norfolk, Virginia and grew-up in a housing project, the son of a single mother and welfare recipient. His inspiration to become an orchestra conductor came from a performance of The Star-Spangled Banner he attended when he was eight years old.

Wilkins received a bachelor's degree in music education from the Shenandoah Conservatory in 1978, and a master of music degree in orchestral conducting from the New England Conservatory of Music in 1982.

Teaching and conducting

Wilkins has taught at North Park University, the University of Tennessee at Chattanooga, and Virginia Commonwealth University.

He worked as assistant director of the Richmond Symphony Orchestra. He also worked as resident director of the Detroit Symphony Orchestra and the Florida Orchestra.

Wilkins became music director of the Omaha Symphony in 2005, and family and youth concert conductor of the Boston Symphony in 2011.  He retired from the Omaha Symphony on June 12, 2021.

Wilkins holds the position of Henry A. Upper Chair of Orchestral Conducting at the Indiana University Jacobs School of Music.

Notes

1956 births
Living people
American male conductors (music)
21st-century American conductors (music)
African-American classical musicians
Musicians from Omaha, Nebraska
Musicians from Norfolk, Virginia
Classical musicians from Virginia
21st-century American male musicians
20th-century American conductors (music)
20th-century American male musicians
Classical musicians from Nebraska
Shenandoah University alumni
New England Conservatory alumni
North Park University
University of Tennessee at Chattanooga faculty
Virginia Commonwealth University faculty
20th-century African-American musicians
21st-century African-American musicians